Simon Tian (born February 24, 1994) is a Canadian businessman, inventor, entrepreneur and investor. He is the co-founder and CEO of Fonus, founder and chief executive officer (CEO) of Neptune, and co-founder of Globle. Born and raised in Montreal, Canada, Tian dropped out of pre-university college at the age of 17 to start Neptune, and, as of late 2017, has raised around $7 million from private investors as well as a total of more than $2 million from crowdfunding sources alone. Tian is a 2015 Thiel Fellow, having been awarded $100,000 by PayPal co-founder and venture capitalist Peter Thiel through the Thiel Foundation, and was named one of the top 30 Quebecers under 30 by Les Affaires in 2014.

Early life 
Tian was born to Chinese Canadian parents in Montreal, Quebec, in 1994. He was raised in Brossard, Quebec, a suburb of Montreal, and attended secondary school at Jean de la Mennais College, a French-speaking school in La Prairie, Quebec. Tian is fluent in English, French, and Mandarin. Tian is also a classically-trained pianist, having won first place in piano performance at the Canadian Music Competition in 2008 at age 13.

Career 
Tian started Neptune, a wearable technology company, in January 2013, while he was 17 and still studying at Marianopolis College, in Westmount, Quebec. Before building a prototype or incorporating the company, Tian posted some conceptual drawings of a smartwatch, the Neptune Pine, on the internet and issued a press release announcing the product's launch. He received more than 20,000 orders for the device in a few weeks. Following the interest in his conceptual drawings, Tian dropped out of school and travelled to China to meet with manufacturers to have the device developed. In November 2013, he launched a crowdfunding campaign to finance the product's development. Within 27 hours, the campaign surpassed its funding goal of $100,000, and went on to raise more than $800,000 in 30 days.

The Pine was prominently featured in the 2017 film The Fate of the Furious, the CBS TV series Extant produced by Steven Spielberg and starring Halle Berry, as well as the music video for the song Smartphones by Trey Songz. The device received mixed reviews from the press, with many criticizing its large size and functionality.

In November 2015, Tian was invited by the Mayor of Montreal Denis Coderre to attend the 2015 Montreal Trade mission to China as one of the city's representatives.

In June 2018, Tian announced his second company, Globle. In its launch press release, the company claimed to be producing a blockchain platform for "democratiz[ing] the creation, development and funding of new projects".

In November 2019, Tian announced the launch of Fonus, an American telecommunications company based in Santa Monica, California, operating as a mobile virtual network operator on AT&T’s network. The company offers a single monthly prepaid plan as opposed to the usual multi-plan offerings of other carriers, providing users with unlimited data, unlimited calls and texts worldwide, and free roaming in the United States, Canada and Mexico at a fixed monthly fee. The data operates on AT&T's cellular network in the United States, whereas the calls and texts are provided through Fonus' proprietary voice over IP (VoIP) application.

Controversies
Tian raised US$1.15 million for the Neptune Suite in 2015, estimating the products would be ready for shipping in April 2016. However, by December 2019, Tian still had not shipped the product to the company's backers, leading ZDNet to claim the company had "jilted" backers. Tian claims that the project ultimately needed more financing to be realized, and that the funds he had raised were not sufficient to complete development of the product.

References 

1994 births
Living people
Businesspeople from Montreal
Thiel fellows